Ardeshiri-ye Vosta (also Romanized as Ardeshīrī-ye Vosţá; also known as Ardeshīrī-ye Mīānī) is a village in Sornabad Rural District, Hamaijan District, Sepidan County, Fars Province, Iran. At the 2006 census, its population was 76, in 18 families.

References 

Populated places in Sepidan County